Howard Grant may refer to:

 Howard Grant (boxer) (born 1966), Canadian retired boxer
 Howard Grant (jockey) (1930s–2018), retired American Thoroughbred horse racing jockey